The 1992 Maine Black Bears football team was an American football team that represented the University of Maine as a member of the Yankee Conference during the 1992 NCAA Division I-AA football season. In their third and final season under head coach Kirk Ferentz, the Black Bears compiled a 6–5 record (4–4 against conference opponents) and tied for fifth place in the Yankee Conference.

Schedule

References

Maine
Maine Black Bears football seasons
Maine Black Bears football